Richard Vickerman Taylor was born in Leeds, Yorkshire, on 10 October 1830, the son of John Taylor and his wife Ann Vickerman. He was married twice, first to Caroline Franks and then to Elizabeth Ann Knowles.

In 1856 he became Senior Classical Master at Bramham College, Tadcaster; and two years later he moved to the same position at Wesley College, Sheffield.  While there he gained a B.A. degree from King's College London.  He also served as an Assistant Master at Leeds Grammar School.

In 1863 he was ordained deacon, taking his priest's orders the following year.  He held a number of curacies, including St Barnabas, Holbeck, Wortley, Brightside near Sheffield and Edlington.  In 1878 he became Vicar of Melbecks, Swaledale. He died at the age of 83 years, on 8 July 1914, at his home, The Mount, Low Row, Swaledale.

A Fellow of the Royal Horticultural Society and a member of the Yorkshire Archaeological and Topographical Association, he also published and contributed to publications on the history of Yorkshire.

Publications 

All listed in the British Library Public Catalogue:

SAYWELL. Joseph Lemuel The Parochial History of Ackworth, Yorks., with archæological, antiquarian, and biographical notes & records (With an introduction by R. V. Taylor) James Atkinson & Son, Pontefract; Simpkin, Marshall & Co.: London, 1894.
 Anecdotæ Eboracenses. Yorkshire Anecdotes; or, remarkable incidents in the lives of celebrated Yorkshire men and women, etc. 
Whittaker & Co.: London, 1883.
 Anecdota Eboracensia. Yorkshire anecdotes, etc. (Second series) Whittaker & Co.: London, 1887.
 The Biographia Leodiensis; or, Biographical Sketches of the Worthies of Leeds and neighbourhood, from the Norman Conquest to the present time, etc. London, 1865–67.
 The Ecclesiæ Leodienses; or, Historical and Architectural Sketches of the Churches of Leeds and neighbourhood, etc. London, 1875.

1830 births
Alumni of King's College London
Clergy from Leeds
19th-century English historians
19th-century English Anglican priests
1914 deaths
Schoolteachers from Yorkshire